Parliamentary elections were held in Southern Cameroons on 24 January 1959. The result was a victory for the Kamerun National Democratic Party, which won 14 of the 26 seats in the House of Assembly.

Results
Of the twelve seats won by the Kamerun National Congress–Kamerun People's Party alliance, eight were won by the KNC and four by the KPP.

References

Southern Cameroons
Parliamentary
Elections in Cameroon
Election and referendum articles with incomplete results